ProgDVB is a freeware/shareware software used to watch digital TV channels and listen to radio on computers. It supports DVB-S (satellite), DVB-S2, DVB-C (cable), DVB-T (terrestrial) and IPTV sources.

Internet polls show that ProgDVB is the most popular program used to watch DVB TV.

Editions 
There is a freeware and a shareware edition of ProgDVB; the shareware edition adds:
 Picture-in-picture support
 Recorder and Scheduler
 Digital Satellite Equipment Control

Starting with version 5.x ProgDVB began using the .NET Framework for its GUI.

References

External links 
 Official Website

Digital Video Broadcasting software